Du Jing (born 23 June 1984) is a former Chinese badminton player from Anshan, Liaoning.

Career
A doubles specialist, Du and her regular partner Yu Yang have steadily emerged as one of the world's elite women's doubles teams since 2004. They confirmed this status by winning the gold medal at the 2008 Olympics in Beijing over South Korea's Lee Kyung-won and Lee Hyo-jung. Their other titles have included the Polish Open (2004); the China Masters (2005); the Asian Championships and Swiss Open in 2006; the Russian, Hong Kong, and Indonesia Opens in 2007; and the French, Korea, and Singapore Opens in 2008. Du and Yu were bronze medalists at the World Championships in 2006, but were unable to play in the tourney's 2007 edition. They were runners-up at the prestigious All-England Championships in 2008, but avenged that loss by beating their All-England conquerors in the Olympic final.

Achievements

Olympic Games 
Women's doubles

BWF World Championships 
Women's doubles

Asian Championships 
Women's doubles

World Junior Championships 
Girls' doubles

Asian Junior Championships 
Girls' doubles

BWF Superseries 
The BWF Superseries has two level such as Superseries and Superseries Premier. A season of Superseries features twelve tournaments around the world, which introduced since 2011, with successful players invited to the Superseries Finals held at the year end.

Women's doubles

 Superseries Finals tournament
 Superseries Premier tournament
 Superseries tournament

BWF Grand Prix 
The BWF Grand Prix has two levels, the Grand Prix Gold and Grand Prix. It is a series of badminton tournaments, sanctioned by the Badminton World Federation (BWF) since 2007. The World Badminton Grand Prix has been sanctioned by the International Badminton Federation since 1983.

Women's doubles

 BWF Grand Prix Gold tournament
 BWF & IBF Grand Prix tournament

IBF International 
Women's doubles

References

External links 
 
 
 
 
 

Chinese female badminton players
1984 births
Living people
Sportspeople from Anshan
Badminton players from Liaoning
Badminton players at the 2008 Summer Olympics
Olympic badminton players of China
Olympic gold medalists for China
Olympic medalists in badminton
Medalists at the 2008 Summer Olympics
World No. 1 badminton players